Absent pulmonary valve syndrome is a congenital heart defect that occurs when the flaps of the pulmonary valve do not develop or are severely underdeveloped (hypoplasia) resulting in aneurysms (dilation) of the pulmonary arteries and softening of the trachea and bronchi (tracheobronchomalacia). Usually, APVS occurs together with other congenital heart defects, most commonly ventricular septal defect and right ventricular outflow tract obstruction. It is sometimes considered a variant of Tetralogy of Fallot.

References

Congenital heart defects
Rare diseases